New Tredegar Rugby Football Club is a Welsh rugby union club team based in New Tredegar. Today, New Tredegar RFC plays in the Welsh Rugby Union, Division Four East League and is a feeder club for the Newport Gwent Dragons. At present the club runs two senior sides and a youth side.

New Tredegar RFC started life in 1977 when it was decided that a senior XV team was required to permit the youth players, who had a team in since the early 1960s, to play locally at a higher level. By 1980 the club was fielding a second senior XV and after joining the Gwent District league in 1994 the team won their first piece of silverware, the Cyrus Davies cup. The club achieved WRU status that year and in the 1995/96 season the club was placed in the lower rungs of the official Welsh leagues. Although they lost their opening match to Machen, they eventually gained in confidence to win the league in their first season.  In 1999 the club managed to buy the Liberal Club which has now become their headquarters.

Club honours
 1995/96 WRU Welsh League Division Eight East - Champions
 2011/12 Swalec Bowl Finalists
Millennium Stadium - Runners Up

References 

Welsh rugby union teams
Rugby clubs established in 1977